The Montagne Noire (known as the 'Black Mountain' in English) is a mountain range in central southern France. It is located at the southwestern end of the Massif Central at the juncture of the Tarn, Hérault and Aude departments.

The mountain is within the Haut-Languedoc Regional Nature Park.

The GSSP for the Tournaisian is near the summit of La Serre hill, in the commune of Cabrières, in the Montagne Noire . The GSSP is in a section on the southern side of the hill, in an 80 cm deep trench, about 125 m south of the summit, 2.5 km southwest of the village of Cabrières and 2.5 km north of the hamlet of Fontès.

References

Landforms of Aude
Landforms of Hérault
Landforms of Tarn (department)
Noire